Müfit Erkasap is a Turkish football coach mostly known as the assistant coach of Fatih Terim at Galatasaray SK and Fiorentina. He is also a former footballer who played as a defender. He played for Orduspor, Galatasaray, Anadoluspor and Bandırmaspor.

References

Living people
Turkish footballers
Galatasaray S.K. (football) managers
Süper Lig managers
Galatasaray S.K. (football) non-playing staff
Association football defenders
Year of birth missing (living people)
Turkish football managers